Social contact can refer to:
In the sociological hierarchy leading up to social relations, an incidental social interaction between individuals
In social networks, a node (representing an individual or organization) to which another node is socially

See also
 Social contract
 Interpersonal relationship